The 1974 season of the Venezuelan Primera División, the top category of Venezuelan football, was played by 8 teams. The national champions were Deportivo Galicia.

Results

First stage

Final Stage

Second Place Playoff

External links
Venezuela 1974 season at RSSSF

Ven
Venezuelan Primera División seasons
Prim